Roll's partridge (Arborophila rolli) is a bird species in the family Phasianidae. It is found in highland forest in northern Sumatra, Indonesia. It is sometimes treated as a subspecies of the grey-breasted partridge.

References

Roll's partridge
Birds of Sumatra
Roll's partridge